The 2010 Metro Atlantic Athletic Conference baseball tournament took place from May 26 through 28. The top four regular season finishers of the league's teams met in the double-elimination tournament held at Dutchess Stadium in Wappingers Falls, New York.  won their second tournament championship and earned the conference's automatic bid to the 2010 NCAA Division I baseball tournament.

Seeding 
The top four teams were seeded one through four based on their conference winning percentage. They then played a double-elimination tournament.

Results

All-Tournament Team 
The following players were named to the All-Tournament Team.

Most Valuable Player 
A.J. Albee was named Tournament Most Valuable Player. Albee was a second baseman for Rider.

References 

Tournament
Metro Atlantic Athletic Conference Baseball Tournament
Metro Atlantic Athletic Conference baseball tournament